is an Irish masculine given name, arising in the Old Irish and Middle Irish/Middle Gaelic languages, as , and later partially Anglicised as Goffraid.

 can be Anglicised as Godfrey or Geoffrey.

 and, less commonly,  are equivalents in the Scottish Gaelic language (from ).

Notable people bearing this name
Godred Crovan (died 1095), also known as "Gofraid", "Gofraidh", and "Gofhraidh", King of Dublin and the Isles
Godred Olafsson (died 1187), also known as "Gofraid", King of Dublin and the Isles
Gofraid Donn (died 1231), King in the Isles
Gofraidh Fionn Ó Dálaigh, (died 1387), an Irish poet and Chief Ollam of Ireland
Gofraid mac Amlaíb meic Ragnaill (died 1075), King of Dublin
Gofraid mac Arailt (died 989), King of the Isles
Gofraidh mac Briain Mac an Bhaird, (fl. 16th century), an Irish bardic poet
Gofraid mac Domnaill (died 1212/1213), Scottish rebel
Gofraid mac Fergusa, supposed 9th-century Gaelic nobleman
Gofraid mac Sitriuc (died 951), King of Dublin
Gofraid mac Sitriuc (died 1070), King of the Isles, father of Fingal mac Gofraid
Gofraid of Lochlann, 9th-century Viking king
Gofraid ua Ímair (died 934), King of Dublin and Northumbria
Goraidh Mac Eachann MacAlasdair (fl. 16th century), chief of Clan MacAlister
Guðrøðr Magnússon (fl. 1275), son of Magnús Óláfsson, King of Mann and the Isles

See also
 Galfrid
 Geoffrey, Geoffroy (surname), Jeffrey, Jeffries, Jeffers
 Godred/Guðrøðr
 Gottfried, Godfrey, Godefroy, Goffredo
 Gruffudd/Gruffydd, Griffith (name), Griffith (surname), Griffiths

References

Irish-language masculine given names